Apriona teocchii is a species of beetle in the family Cerambycidae. It was described by Jiroux in 2011.

References

Batocerini
Beetles described in 2011